The 2019–20 Navy Midshipmen men's basketball team represented the United States Naval Academy during the 2019–20 NCAA Division I men's basketball season. The Midshipmen were led by ninth-year head coach Ed DeChellis, and played their home games at Alumni Hall in Annapolis, Maryland as members of the Patriot League. They finished the season 14–16, 8–10 in Patriot League play to finish in a tie for sixth place. They lost in the first round of the Patriot League tournament to Boston University.

Previous season 
The Midshipmen finished the 2019–20 season 12–19, 8–10 in Patriot League play to finish in a tie for fifth place. As the No. 5 seed in the Patriot League tournament, they advanced to the semifinals, where they were defeated by eventual tournament champion Colgate.

Roster

Schedule and results

|-
!colspan=9 style=| Non-conference regular season

|-
!colspan=9 style=| Patriot League regular season

|-
!colspan=9 style=| Patriot League tournament

Source

References

Navy Midshipmen men's basketball seasons
Navy
Navy
Navy